WIZM may refer to:

 WIZM (AM), a radio station (1410 AM) licensed to La Crosse, Wisconsin, United States
 WIZM-FM, a radio station (93.3 FM) licensed to La Crosse, Wisconsin, United States